Statistics of the Maldives 2009 Wataniya Dhivehi League

Dhivehi League

2010 Dhivehi League promotion/relegation play-off

External links
Maldives 2009, RSSSF.com

Dhivehi League seasons
Maldives
Maldives
1